Doveton Soccer Club is an Australian semi-professional soccer club based in the south-eastern Melbourne suburb of Eumemmerring. Founded in 1967 by European Australians but mostly from England, the club currently competes in the National Premier League 3, operating under license from Football Victoria. Presently competing in the third highest level of Victorian state soccer, the club has competed in all of the first seven league tiers, and have been mitre premiers in all except for the first and sixth tiers.

Honours

State
Victorian State Second Tier
Premiers (2): 1980, 1990
Victorian State Third Tier
Premiers (2): 1977, 2019 (South-East)
Runner's Up (1): 1988
Victorian State Third Tier Finals
Runner's Up (1): 2019 (South-East)
Victorian State Fourth Tier
Premiers (2): 2012 (South-East), 2018 (South-East)
Runner's Up (1): 1975
Victorian State Fourth Tier Reserves
Premiers (2): 2014 (South-East), 2018 (South-East)
Victorian State Fifth Tier
Premiers (3): 2001 (South-East), 2006 (South-East), 2010 (South-East)
Runner's Up (1): 1973
Victorian State Seventh Tier
Premiers (1): 1970 (East)
Runner's Up (1): 1999 (South-East)

Sources:

Other
Mens Masters
Runner's Up (1): 2012 (South-East)
Metropolitan League 4
Runner's Up (1): 2013 (South-East)

Sources:

References

Soccer clubs in Melbourne
Diaspora sports clubs in Australia
Victorian Premier League teams
Association football clubs established in 1967
Victorian State League teams
1967 establishments in Australia
National Premier Leagues clubs
European-Australian culture
Sport in the City of Casey